Manfredonia Lighthouse is an active lighthouse located at the debut of the east pier of the harbour of Manfredonia, in Apulia on the Adriatic Sea.

Description
The lighthouse is completely automated and is managed by the Marina Militare with the identification code number 3796 E.F.

See also
 List of lighthouses in Italy
 Manfredonia

References

External links

 Servizio Fari Marina Militare

Lighthouses in Italy